Joy Spence (born 1951) is a Jamaican chemist and master blender at Appleton Estate. She was the first female master blender in the spirits industry.

Early life and education 
Spence was born in Manchester, Jamaica in 1951 and was raised in Kingston by her adoptive parents. Her passion for chemistry began at age 13. Spence attended the University of the West Indies, graduating with First Class Honors in 1972. She earned her master's degree in analyticial chemistry at the University of Loughborough in England.

Career 
Spence started as a research and development chemist at Tia Maria, then was hired by J. Wray and Nephew Ltd., a rum company. In 1981, the rum distillery Appleton Estate, which was owned by Wray and Nephew, hired Spence as its chief chemist.

At Appleton, Spence worked with Owen Tulloch, the master blender at the time, who recognized Spence's ability to identify and differentiate between smells, describing it as an "organoleptic talent". After working with Tulloch for 17 years, Spence was promoted to master blender on Tulloch's retirement. Her first creation as the master blender was a special rum to celebrate the 250th anniversary of Appleton Estate, which received high praise in the industry. Spence has also created special rum blends for select customers, such as Ronald Reagan, Prince William, and Prince Harry.

At Appleton Estate, Spence serves as a brand ambassador, travelling about 40% of the time, and is also the general manager for technical and quality service.. For her service to the rum industry, Jamaica awarded Spence the Order of Distinction in the class of Officer in 2005.

Spence was instrumental in achieving geographical indication for Jamaican rum, which was awarded in 2016.

In 2017, Appleton Estate released the Joy Anniversary Blend of rum to commemorate her 20 years as their master blender. The Joy Anniversary Blend was named Rum of the Year in 2017 by Distiller.com. Her 40th year at Appleton Estate was marked by the release of the Ruby Anniversary Edition in 2022.

In 2017, Tales of the Cocktail gave Spence the Grand Dame Award as "the most influential woman in the cocktail and spirits industry". The Prime Minister's Medal for Science and Technology (now known as the National Medal for Science and Technology) was awarded to Spence in 2018. The Distilled Spirits Council of the United States awarded Spence their Lifetime Achievement Award in 2022.

Tours of the Appleton Estate distillery are named The Joy Spence Appleton Estate Rum Experience.

Spence was awarded the Musgrave Gold Medal in 2022.

Personal life 
Spence is married and has two children.

References 

1951 births
Living people
Jamaican women chemists
Whisky blenders
Alumni of Loughborough University
University of the West Indies alumni